Sabira Aliyeva (born 25 September 1995) is an Azerbaijani freestyle wrestler. She won one of the bronze medals in the 76 kg event at the 2018 European Wrestling Championships held in Kaspiysk, Russia.

Career 

In 2019, she competed in the women's freestyle 76 kg event at the European Games held in Minsk, Belarus. She lost her bronze medal match against Iselin Moen Solheim of Norway.

In 2021, she lost her bronze medal match in the 76 kg event at the European Wrestling Championships in Warsaw, Poland.

Achievements

References

External links 
 

Living people
1995 births
Place of birth missing (living people)
Azerbaijani female sport wrestlers
European Wrestling Championships medalists
Wrestlers at the 2019 European Games
European Games competitors for Azerbaijan
Islamic Solidarity Games medalists in wrestling
Islamic Solidarity Games competitors for Azerbaijan
21st-century Azerbaijani women